Ryazan is the name of several inhabited localities in Russia.

Urban localities
Ryazan, a city in Ryazan Oblast

Rural localities
Ryazan, Arkhangelsk Oblast, a village in Nikolsky Selsoviet of Vilegodsky District in Arkhangelsk Oblast
Ryazan, Moscow Oblast, a village in Nikolskoye Rural Settlement of Odintsovsky District in Moscow Oblast; 
Ryazan, Smolensk Oblast, a village in Frunzenskoye Rural Settlement of Dorogobuzhsky District in Smolensk Oblast
Ryazan, Tver Oblast, a village in Tsentralnoye Rural Settlement of Kimrsky District in Tver Oblast
Ryazan, Vologda Oblast, a village in Korotovsky Selsoviet of Cherepovetsky District in Vologda Oblast